The 2017 Austrian Grand Prix (formally known as the Formula 1 Grosser Preis von Österreich 2017) was a Formula One motor race that took place on 9 July 2017 at the Red Bull Ring in Spielberg, Austria.

Ferrari driver Sebastian Vettel entered the round as the championship leader, with a 14-point advantage over Lewis Hamilton, and extended it to 20 points. Mercedes led Ferrari by 24 points in the Constructors' standings at the start of the round, and extended it to 33 points.

Qualifying

Notes
 – Lewis Hamilton received a five-place grid penalty for an unscheduled gearbox change.
 – Pascal Wehrlein was required to start from pit lane, as his car was modified while under Parc Fermé conditions.

Race
At the start Valtteri Bottas made a perfect get away to lead Sebastian Vettel into the first corner, behind them there was problems with Daniil Kvyat hitting Fernando Alonso who then in turn hit Max Verstappen, both Alonso and Verstappen retired, Kvyat was given a drive through penalty for causing the accident. Bottas came under investigation for a jump start but the stewards issued no penalty. The rest of the race had little action until towards the end Vettel applied pressure on Bottas for the lead but ultimately he failed to get passed Bottas who won the race. Daniel Ricciardo meanwhile held off Lewis Hamilton for the final podium spot allowing Vettel to extend his championship lead to 20 points.

Race classification

Championship standings after the race 

Drivers' Championship standings

Constructors' Championship standings

 Note: Only the top five positions are included for both sets of standings.

See also 
 2017 Spielberg Formula 2 round
 2017 Spielberg GP3 Series round

References

External links

 Official event website

Austrian
Austrian Grand Prix
Grand Prix
Austrian Grand Prix